Oscar Francisco Jiménez Fabela (born 12 October 1988) is a Mexican professional footballer who plays as a goalkeeper for Liga MX club América.

Club career
Jiménez started his career with Indios de Ciudad Juárez.

In 2010 he was transferred on loan to Cruz Azul Hidalgo. The same year he joined Lobos BUAP where he played a total of 36 between Segunda División and Copa MX.

In 2013 Jiménez was transferred to Chiapas Jaguar.

América
The goalkeeper depth chart was depleted after Moisés Muñoz and Hugo González Durán were transferred out to their respective teams. After Club América signed Agustín Marchesín, Jiménez was signed on as the backup goalkeeper.

After Marchesin departed to Porto FC, Jiménez later became the first choice goalkeeper for the team until his role was taken over by Guillermo Ochoa.

Honours
América
Liga MX: Apertura 2018
Copa MX: Clausura 2019
Campeón de Campeones: 2019

References

1988 births
Living people
Footballers from Chihuahua
People from Chihuahua City
Association football goalkeepers
Chiapas F.C. footballers
Club América footballers
Lobos BUAP footballers
Indios de Ciudad Juárez footballers
Mexican footballers